The Centro Comercial Santafé is a mall located in Bogotá, Colombia. It is the fourth  largest shopping mall in Colombia (the largest is Centro Mayor in Bogotá), and the fifth in Latin America, surpassed by Leste Aricanduva Mall in São Paulo, Brazil. Opened on May 13, 2006. The mall has 485 shops, including an open foodcourt with 26 restaurants that has a seating for 1,500 persons. The mall also has 10 cinemas, 3,200 parking stalls, and an auditorium.

The mall is in the neighborhood of Suba, which is in northeastern Bogotá on the North Highway on 183 street. The mall has access by bus from the municipalities surrounding the city and along the route system of TransMilenio from the Portal North, "2.1 Mirandela."

The mall is divided into six squares, which are the Venezuela Plaza, Colombia Plaza, Ecuador Plaza, Peru Plaza, France Plaza, and Italy Plaza. It has 3 floors and two lower levels for parking.

The larger stores in the complex are Jumbo (in Plaza Francia), Falabella (in Plaza Italia), and the Cine Colombia, Zara, and Miniso (in Plaza Italia). The complex also includes a wide selection of restaurants.

Another Santafé Commercial Center was opened in Medellin in May 2010.

Restaurants 
You can find some of the most important restaurants such as Crepes & Waffles, Frisby, Mc Donald's, Kokoriko

See also 
 Centro Andino
Unicentro

References

External links 
 Web Oficial del Centro Comercial Santafé

Shopping malls in Bogotá